Carlos James (born October 12, 1971) is an American college baseball coach, currently serving as head coach of the Arkansas–Pine Bluff Golden Lions baseball program.  He was named to that position prior to the 2011 NCAA Division I baseball season.

Playing career
James was drafted out of high school by the Oakland Athletics in the 1990 MLB Draft, but elected to play college ball at Seminole State College of Oklahoma. He played two seasons with the Trojans, and reached the NJCAA College World Series in both the 1991 and 1992 seasons. He then completed his eligibility at Arkansas. After his time with the Razorbacks, James played a pair of seasons with the Independent, Pine Bluff Locomotives.

Coaching career
James served as manager of the Arkansas Prospects of Little Rock and APAK Scout Team of Memphis, travelling teams designed to showcase talent to college and professional coaches and scouts. James also served as a scout for the Seattle Mariners. He served as an assistant coach with Arkansas–Pine Bluff from 2000–2004, and also coached local teams in Pine Bluff. He was named interim head coach at Arkansas–Monticello in 2008 before becoming full-time head coach the following season. He improved the struggling program and helped them compete in the Gulf South Conference, as the first African-American to be named head coach in any sport at UAM, and the first for baseball in the Gulf South. In 2011, James became head coach at Arkansas–Pine Bluff, and earned Southwestern Athletic Conference Coach of the Year in 2013. and in his fourth season led the Golden Lions to their first ever 2014 SWAC Western Division Championship in school history.

Head coaching record
This table shows James' record as a head coach at the Division I level.

See also
List of current NCAA Division I baseball coaches

References

External links

Living people
1971 births
Baseball outfielders
Sportspeople from Pine Bluff, Arkansas
Arkansas Razorbacks baseball players
Arkansas–Monticello Boll Weevils baseball coaches
Arkansas–Pine Bluff Golden Lions baseball coaches
Pine Bluff Locomotives players
Seattle Mariners scouts
Seminole State Trojans baseball players
African-American baseball coaches
Baseball coaches from Arkansas